Juan Ginés Sánchez Moreno (born 15 May 1972) is a Spanish former professional footballer who played as a striker.

In a career almost entirely associated to Valencia – which he helped to two La Liga titles – and Celta, he scored 89 goals as a professional in 361 games.

Club career
Born in Aldaia, Valencian Community, Sánchez started playing professionally for Valencia CF, and his first La Liga appearance was on 25 October 1992 in a 0–3 loss at FC Barcelona. In the season's closing stages he scored his first goal(s) for the Che, having come on as a late substitute in a 2–0 home win over RCD Español.

After a successful loan stint in the second division with RCD Mallorca, Sánchez signed with RC Celta de Vigo, becoming an important attacking element in the Galicians' domestic and European consolidation. In his last two seasons, as they finished respectively sixth and fifth, he totalled 22 goals, eventually returning to his first club.

Sánchez scored 12 times in the league in the 2000–01 campaign, notably back-to-back braces against CD Numancia (3–0) and UD Las Palmas (5–1). He added a further two in the UEFA Champions League semi-final second leg against Leeds United for a 3–0 home victory, being replaced in the final loss to FC Bayern Munich.

Subsequently, after having appeared in 25 games in the team's 2001–02 league conquest, Sánchez's importance lessened dramatically in his final season, where he played only ten matches for the champions, no complete ones. He retired aged 34 after a second stint at Celta, which he helped achieve a return to the top tier.

Sánchez became Valencia's sporting director in April 2008, succeeding Miguel Ángel Ruiz and leaving the post in August. In June 2009 he moved to R.E. Mouscron from Belgium in the same capacity, rejoining former Valencia teammates Amedeo Carboni and Miroslav Đukić – the latter being signed as head coach.

International career
Sánchez earned one cap for Spain, playing 12 minutes in a 2–2 friendly match against Italy on 18 November 1998 in Salerno.

Honours
Valencia
La Liga: 2001–02, 2003–04
Supercopa de España: 1999
UEFA Cup: 2003–04
UEFA Champions League runner-up: 1999–2000, 2000–01

Celta
Segunda División: 2004–05

References

External links

CiberChe biography and stats 

1972 births
Living people
People from Horta Oest
Sportspeople from the Province of Valencia
Spanish footballers
Footballers from the Valencian Community
Association football forwards
La Liga players
Segunda División players
Segunda División B players
Tercera División players
Valencia CF Mestalla footballers
Valencia CF players
RCD Mallorca players
RC Celta de Vigo players
Spain under-21 international footballers
Spain international footballers